12 Monkeys is a 1995 American science fiction film directed by Terry Gilliam, inspired by Chris Marker's 1962 short film La Jetée, starring Bruce Willis, Madeleine Stowe, and Brad Pitt, with Christopher Plummer and David Morse in supporting roles. After Universal Studios acquired the rights to remake La Jetée as a full-length film, David and Janet Peoples were hired to write the script.

Under Gilliam's direction, Universal granted the filmmakers a $29.5 million budget, and filming lasted from February to May 1995. The film was shot mostly in Philadelphia and Baltimore, where the story was set.

The film was released to critical praise and grossed $168.8 million worldwide. Pitt was nominated for the Academy Award for Best Supporting Actor, and he won a Golden Globe Award for his performance. The film also won and was nominated for various categories at the Saturn Awards.

Plot 
A deadly virus, released in 1996, wipes out almost all of humanity, forcing survivors to live underground. A group known as the Army of the Twelve Monkeys is believed to have released the virus.

In 2035, James Cole is a prisoner living in an underground compound beneath Philadelphia. Cole is selected to be sent back in time to find the original virus to help scientists develop a cure in exchange for a reduced sentence. Meanwhile, Cole is troubled by dreams involving a foot chase and shooting at an airport.

Cole arrives in Baltimore, in 1990, not 1996 as planned; he is arrested and incarcerated at a mental hospital on the diagnosis of Dr. Kathryn Railly. There he encounters Jeffrey Goines, a mental patient with environmentalist and anti-corporatist views. Cole is interviewed by a panel of doctors where he tries to explain that the virus outbreak has already happened.

After an escape attempt, Cole is sedated and locked in a cell, but he disappears, waking up back in 2035. Cole is interrogated by the scientists who play a distorted voicemail message that asserts the association of the Army of the Twelve Monkeys with the virus. He is also shown photos of numerous people suspected of being involved, including Goines. The scientists offer Cole another chance to complete his mission and send him back in time. Cole accidentally arrives at a battlefield during World War I, is shot in the leg and then transported to 1996.

In 1996, Railly gives a lecture about the Cassandra complex to a group of scientists. At the post-lecture book signing, Railly meets Dr. Peters who tells her that apocalypse alarmists represent the sane vision while humanity's gradual destruction of the environment is the real lunacy.

Cole arrives at the venue after seeing flyers publicizing it and, when Railly departs, he kidnaps her and forces her to take him to Philadelphia. They learn that Goines is the founder of the Army of the Twelve Monkeys before they set out in search of him. When Cole confronts Goines, he denies any involvement with the group and says that, in 1990, Cole originated the idea of wiping out humanity with a virus stolen from Goines' virologist father, Dr. Leland Goines.

Cole is transported back to 2035 where he reaffirms to the scientists his commitment to his mission. But when he finds Railly again in 1996, he tells her he now believes himself crazy as she had suggested. Meanwhile, Railly has discovered evidence of his time travel which she shows him, believing he is sane. They decide to depart for the Florida Keys before the onset of the plague.

They learn that the Army of the Twelve Monkeys was not the source of the epidemic; the group's major act of protest is releasing animals from a zoo and placing Goines' father in an animal cage. At the airport, Cole leaves a message telling the scientists that following the Army of the Twelve Monkeys is the wrong track and he will not return. Cole is confronted by Jose, his cell mate from his own time, who gives Cole a handgun and instructs him to follow orders.

Railly spots Dr. Peters at the airport and recognizes him from a newspaper as an assistant of Goines' father. Peters is about to embark on a tour of several cities that match the locations of the viral outbreaks.

Cole forces his way through a security checkpoint in pursuit of Peters. After drawing his gun, Cole is shot by police. As Cole lies dying in Railly's arms, Railly suddenly begins to scan the crowd around her. Railly finally makes eye contact with a small boy—the young James Cole witnessing the scene of his own death, which will replay in his dreams for years to come. Peters, aboard the plane with the virus, sits down next to Jones, one of the scientists from the future, who comments that her job is "insurance". The young Cole watches the plane take off from the ground outside the airport.

Cast

Production

Development 

The genesis of 12 Monkeys came from executive producer Robert Kosberg, who had been a fan of the French short film La Jetée (1962). Kosberg persuaded that film's director, Chris Marker, to let him pitch the project to Universal Pictures, seeing it as a perfect basis for a full-length science fiction film. Universal agreed to purchase the remake rights and hired David and Janet Peoples to write the screenplay. Producer Charles Roven chose Terry Gilliam to direct, because he believed the filmmaker's style was perfect for 12 Monkeys nonlinear storyline and time travel subplot. Gilliam had just abandoned a film adaptation of A Tale of Two Cities when he signed to direct 12 Monkeys. The film also represents the second film for which Gilliam did not write or co-write the screenplay. Although he prefers to direct his own scripts, he was captivated by Peoples' "intriguing and intelligent script. The story is disconcerting. It deals with time, madness and a perception of what the world is or isn't. It is a study of madness and dreams, of death and re-birth, set in a world coming apart."

Universal took longer than expected to approve 12 Monkeys, although Gilliam had two stars (Willis and Pitt) and a firm budget of $29.5 million (low for a Hollywood science fiction film). Universal's production of Waterworld (1995) had resulted in various cost overruns. To get 12 Monkeys approved for production, Gilliam persuaded Willis to lower his normal asking price. Because of Universal's strict production incentives and his history with the studio on Brazil, Gilliam received final cut privilege. The Writers Guild of America was skeptical of the "inspired by" credit for La Jetée and Chris Marker.

Casting 
Gilliam's initial casting choices were Nick Nolte as James Cole and Jeff Bridges as Jeffrey Goines, but Universal objected. Gilliam, who first met Bruce Willis while casting Jeff Bridges' role in The Fisher King (1991), believed Willis evoked Cole's characterization as being "somebody who is strong and dangerous but also vulnerable".

Gilliam cast Madeleine Stowe as Dr. Kathryn Railly because he was impressed by her performance in Blink (1994). The director first met Stowe when he was casting his abandoned film adaptation of A Tale of Two Cities. "She has this incredible ethereal beauty and she's incredibly intelligent", Gilliam said of Stowe. "Those two things rest very easily with her, and the film needed those elements because it has to be romantic."

Gilliam originally believed that Pitt was not right for the role of Jeffrey Goines, but the casting director convinced him otherwise. Pitt was cast for a comparatively small salary, as he was still relatively unknown at the time. By the time of 12 Monkeys release, Interview with the Vampire (1994), Legends of the Fall (1994), and Se7en (1995) had been released, making Pitt an A-list actor, which drew greater attention to the film and boosted its box-office standing. In Philadelphia, months before filming, Pitt spent weeks at Temple University's hospital, visiting and studying the psychiatric ward to prepare for his role.

Filming 

Principal photography lasted from February 8 to May 6, 1995. Shooting on location in Philadelphia and Baltimore (including the Senator Theatre) in winter was fraught with weather problems. There were also technical glitches with the futuristic mechanical props. Because the film has a nonlinear storyline, continuity errors occurred, and some scenes had to be reshot. Gilliam also injured himself when he went horseback riding. Despite setbacks, the director managed to stay within the budget and was only a week behind his shooting schedule. "It was a tough shoot", acknowledged Jeffrey Beecroft (Mr. Brooks, Dances with Wolves), the production designer. "There wasn't a lot of money or enough time. Terry is a perfectionist, but he was really adamant about not going over budget. He got crucified for Munchausen, and that still haunts him."

The filmmakers were not allowed the luxury of sound stages; thus, they had to find abandoned buildings or landmarks to use. The exteriors of the climactic airport scene were shot at the Baltimore–Washington International Airport, while the interior scenes were shot at the Pennsylvania Convention Center (formerly Reading Terminal). Filming at the psychiatric hospital was done at the Eastern State Penitentiary and Girard College. Some shots took place in abandoned motels in Camden, New Jersey.

Design 
Gilliam used the same filmmaking style as he had in Brazil (1985), including the art direction and cinematography (specifically using fresnel lenses). The appearance of the interrogation room where Cole is being interviewed by the scientists was based on the work of Lebbeus Woods; these scenes were shot at three different power stations (two in Philadelphia and one in Baltimore). Gilliam intended to show Cole being interviewed through a multi-screen interrogation TV set because he felt the machinery evoked a "nightmarish intervention of technology. You try to see the faces on the screens in front of you, but the real faces and voices are down there and you have these tiny voices in your ear. To me that's the world we live in, the way we communicate these days, through technical devices that pretend to be about communication but may not be."

The art department made sure that the 2035 underground world only used pre-1996 technology as a means to depict the bleakness of the future. Gilliam, Beecroft, and Crispian Sallis (set decorator) went to several flea markets and salvage warehouses looking for materials to decorate the sets. The majority of visual effects sequences were created by Peerless Camera, the London-based effects studio that Gilliam founded in the late 1970s with visual effects supervisor Kent Houston (The Golden Compass, Casino Royale). Additional digital compositing was done by The Mill, while Cinesite provided film scanning services.

Janet Maslin wrote in The New York Times, "Since 12 Monkeys has the junk heap aesthetic that Mr. Gilliam favors, nothing in the film is sleek or foolproof, certainly not its time-travel apparatus."

Music 
The film's score was composed, arranged, and conducted by English musician Paul Buckmaster. The main theme is based on Argentine tango musician/composer Astor Piazzolla's Suite Punta del Este.

Themes

Memory, time, and technology 

12 Monkeys studies the subjective nature of memories and their effect on perceptions of reality. Examples of false memories include Cole's recollection of the airport shooting, altered each time he has the dream, and a "mentally divergent" man at the asylum who has false memories.

References to time, time travel, and monkeys are scattered throughout the film, including the Woody Woodpecker cartoon "Time Tunnel" playing on the TV in a hotel room, the Marx Brothers film Monkey Business (1931) on TV in the asylum, and the subplots involving monkeys (drug testing, news stories and animal rights). The film is also intended to be a study of people's declining ability to communicate in modern civilization due to the interference of technology.

Allusions to other films and media 
12 Monkeys is inspired by the French short film La Jetée (1962); as in La Jetée, characters are haunted by the images of their own deaths. Like La Jetée, 12 Monkeys contains references to Alfred Hitchcock's Vertigo (1958). Toward the end of the film, Cole and Railly hide in a theater showing a 24-hour Hitchcock marathon and watch scenes from Vertigo and The Birds. Railly then transforms herself with a blonde wig, as Judy (Kim Novak) transforms herself into blonde Madeleine in Vertigo; Cole sees her emerge within a red light, as Scottie (James Stewart) saw Judy emerge within a green light. Brief notes of Bernard Herrmann's film score can also be heard. Railly also wears the same coat Novak wore in the first part of Vertigo. The scene at Muir Woods National Monument, where Judy (as Madeleine) looks at the growth rings of a felled redwood and traces back events in her past life, resonates with larger themes in 12 Monkeys. Cole and Railly later have a similar conversation while the same music from Vertigo is repeated. The Muir Woods scene in Vertigo is also reenacted in La Jetée. In a previous scene in the film, Cole wakes up in a hospital bed with the scientists talking to him in chorus. This is a direct homage to the "Dry Bones" scene in Dennis Potter's The Singing Detective.

James Cole is a notable Christ figure in film. The film is significant in the genre of science-fiction film noir, and it alludes to various "canonical noir" films.

Release

Home media
Universal Pictures released 12 Monkeys on VHS on January 28, 1997. It was also released on a "Signature Collection" LaserDisc of the film on February 18, 1997, containing an audio commentary by director Terry Gilliam and producer Charles Roven, The Hamster Factor and Other Tales of Twelve Monkeys (a making-of documentary), an archive of production art, and production notes.
It was first released on DVD on March 31, 1998, containing the same extras as the LaserDisc. It was re-released as a Special Edition DVD on May 10, 2005, with a new transfer of the film and identical extras. It was also released on HD DVD on March 4, 2008, with the same extras. It was released on Blu-ray Disc on July 28, 2009, with the same extras. Arrow Films released a new Blu-ray of the film on October 15, 2018, containing a new transfer of the film, remastered in 4K from the original negative, all of the previous extras, as well as a vintage 1996 interview with Terry Gilliam, and an interview with Gilliam scholar Ian Christie.

Lebbeus Woods lawsuit 
In the beginning of the film, Cole is brought into the interrogation room and told to sit in a chair attached to a vertical rail on the wall. A sphere supported by a metal armature is suspended directly in front of him, probing for weaknesses as the inquisitors interrogate him. Architect Lebbeus Woods filed a lawsuit against Universal in February 1996, claiming that his work "Neomechanical Tower (Upper) Chamber" was used without permission. Woods won his lawsuit, requiring Universal to remove the scenes, but he ultimately allowed their inclusion in exchange for a "high six-figure cash settlement" from Universal.

Trilogy claims 

After the release of The Zero Theorem in 2013, claims were made that Gilliam had meant it as part of a trilogy. A 2013 review for The Guardian newspaper said, "Calling it [The Zero Theorem] the third part of a trilogy formed by earlier dystopian satires Brazil and Twelve Monkeys [sic]"; but in an interview with Alex Suskind for Indiewire in late 2014, Gilliam said, "Well, it's funny, this trilogy was never something I ever said, but it's been repeated so often it's clearly true [laughs]. I don't know who started it but once it started it never stopped".

Reception

Box office
12 Monkeys was given a limited release in the United States on December 29, 1995. When the 1,629-theater wide release came on January 5, 1996, the film earned $13.84 million in its opening weekend. 12 Monkeys eventually grossed $57.1 million in the US and $111.7 million in other countries, for a worldwide total of $168.8 million. The film held the No. 1 spot on box office charts for two weeks in January, before dropping due to competition from From Dusk till Dawn, Mr. Holland's Opus and Black Sheep.

Critical response 
On Rotten Tomatoes, the film holds an approval rating of 88% based on 74 reviews, with an average rating of 7.60/10. The site's critics consensus reads: "The plot's a bit of a jumble, but excellent performances and mind-blowing plot twists make 12 Monkeys a kooky, effective experience." Metacritic assigned the film a weighted average score of 74 out of 100, based on 20 critics, indicating "generally favorable reviews". Audiences polled by CinemaScore gave the film an average grade of "B" on an A+ to F scale.

Roger Ebert found 12 Monkeys depiction of the future similar to Blade Runner (1982; also scripted by David Peoples) and Brazil (1985; also directed by Terry Gilliam). "The film is a celebration of madness and doom, with a hero who tries to prevail against the chaos of his condition, and is inadequate", Ebert wrote. "This vision is a cold, dark, damp one, and even the romance between Willis and Stowe feels desperate rather than joyous. All of this is done very well, and the more you know about movies (especially the technical side), the more you're likely to admire it. [...] And as entertainment, it appeals more to the mind than to the senses."

Desson Thomson of The Washington Post praised the art direction and set design. "Willis and Pitt's performances, Gilliam's atmospherics and an exhilarating momentum easily outweigh such trifling flaws in the script", Thomson wrote. Peter Travers from Rolling Stone magazine attributes the film's success to Gilliam's direction and Willis' performance. Internet reviewer James Berardinelli believed the filmmakers had an intelligent and creative motive for the time-travel subplot. Rather than being sent to change the past, James Cole is instead observing it to make a better future. Richard Corliss of Time magazine felt the film's time-travel aspect and apocalyptic depiction of a bleak future were clichés. "In its frantic mix of chaos, carnage and zoo animals, 12 Monkeys is Jumanji for adults", Corliss wrote.

Accolades

Brad Pitt was nominated for the Academy Award for Best Supporting Actor, but lost out to Kevin Spacey for his performance in The Usual Suspects. Costume designer Julie Weiss was also nominated for her work, but lost out to James Acheson of Restoration. However, Pitt won the Golden Globe Award for Best Supporting Actor in a Motion Picture. Terry Gilliam was honored for his direction at the 46th Berlin International Film Festival.

The film also received positive notices from the science fiction community. It was nominated for the Hugo Award for Best Dramatic Presentation and the Academy of Science Fiction, Fantasy and Horror Films awarded it the Saturn Award for Best Science Fiction Film at the 22nd Saturn Awards. Pitt and Weiss won awards at the ceremony as well; Gilliam, Bruce Willis, Madeleine Stowe, and writers David and Janet Peoples also received nominations.

Television series  

On August 26, 2013, Entertainment Weekly announced that Syfy was developing a 12 Monkeys television series based on the film. Production began in November 2013. The pilot was written by Terry Matalas and Travis Fickett, who had written for the series Terra Nova. Due to the series being labeled as "cast contingent", the series did not move forward until the roles of Cole and Goines were cast. In April 2014, Syfy green-lighted the first season, which consisted of 13 episodes, including the pilot filmed in 2013. The series premiered on January 16, 2015. On March 12, 2015, the series was renewed for a second season that began airing in April 2016. On June 29, 2016, the series was renewed for a 10-episode third season, set to premiere in 2017. In a surprising move, the entire third season aired over three consecutive nights. A fourth and final season was announced on March 16, 2017. The eleven-episode fourth season ran from June 15 to July 6, 2018 for four straight weeks.

References

Further reading

External links 

 
 
 12 Monkeys at DailyScript.com

1995 films
1995 science fiction films
1990s dystopian films
American neo-noir films
American science fiction films
Apocalyptic films
American dystopian films
Eco-terrorism in fiction
1990s English-language films
Environmental films
Features based on short films
Films about animal rights
Films about viral outbreaks
Films directed by Terry Gilliam
Films set in 1990
Films set in 1996
Films set in 2035
Films set in Baltimore
Films set in Philadelphia
Films set in psychiatric hospitals
Films shot in Baltimore
Films shot in Philadelphia
Films shot in New Jersey
American nonlinear narrative films
American post-apocalyptic films
Films with screenplays by David Peoples
Films about time travel
Atlas Entertainment films
American remakes of French films
Films featuring a Best Supporting Actor Golden Globe winning performance
Works subject to a lawsuit
Films set in a movie theatre
1990s American films